Pantaleo is an Italian name.  Notable individuals with this surname include: 
 Mario Pantaleo (1915-1992), Italian priest who lived most of his life in Argentina
 Rocco Pantaleo (1956-2010), Italian restaurateur
 Daniel Pantaleo, NYPD officer responsible for the killing of Eric Garner
 Mauro Giuseppe Sergio Pantaleo Giuliani (1781-1829), Italian guitar virtuoso known as Mauro Giuliani

Notable individuals with this given name include: 
 Pantaleo Carabellese (1877-1948), Italian philosopher
 Pantaleo Corvino (b. 1949), Italian director of football (soccer)

San Pantaleo
St Pantaleo or Pantaleon is a 4th century saint, whose veneration was widespread in Italy:
 San Pantaleo Cathedral, better known as Dolianova Cathedral, in Sardinia
 San Pantaleo: Neoclassical church in central Rome
San Pantaleone Martire: 17th-century church in Dorsoduro, Venice known as San Pantalon
San Pantaleo: small island off the west coast of Sicily, once site of the ancient city of Motya, and now part of the town of Marsala, Italy.

See also
 Pantaleon

Italian-language surnames